Ivy is the debut studio album by German singer Ivy Quainoo. Released by Warner Music on 2 March 2012 in German-speaking Europe following her win of the first series of The Voice of Germany, it features production by Marek Pompetzki, Paul NZA, Cecil Remmler, Ivo Moring, Thorsten Brötzmann, and Hoss Power. It charted in Austria, Germany and Switzerland, reaching the top 10 of both the German and the Swiss Albums Charts. Ivy spawned the singles "Do You Like What You See", "You Got Me" and "Who You Are".

Singles
"Do You Like What You See" was the first single released from the album. It was released on 3 February 2012. The song reached number 2 in Germany, number 8 in Austria and number 12 in Switzerland. "You Got Me" was released on 7 June 2012 as the second single from the album. The album's third and final single, "Who You Are", was released on 16 November 2012.

Promotion
In support of the album, Quainoo embarked on The Ivy Quainoo Tour from May to June 2012. The opening act was Mic Donet.

Track listing

Charts

Weekly charts

Year-end charts

Certifications

Release history

References

2012 debut albums